The Fiat Fastback is a subcompact coupe crossover SUV produced by Fiat mainly for the South American market, which was released in August 2022. It is the coupe SUV version of the Fiat Pulse and based on the same MLA platform. In Brazil, it is positioned as a flagship Fiat model only below the imported Fiat 500e. It is available with the 1.0-litre turbocharged and 1.3-litre turbocharged petrol engines. The Fastback nameplate was previously used for a concept coupe SUV based on the Fiat Toro in 2018.

Engines

Safety
The Fastback comes with 4 airbags, LED lighting, automatic high beam, tire pressure monitoring system, hill holder, traction control system, ESC, lane departure warning system, front ventilated disc brakes, ABS with EBD, ESS, and collision avoidance system. Cornering fog lights are optional.

Sales

References

External links

Fastback
Cars introduced in 2022
Mini sport utility vehicles
Crossover sport utility vehicles
Front-wheel-drive vehicles
Cars of Brazil